Tropical Storm Chris caused minor flooding in the Greater Antilles and the Eastern United States in August 1988. The seventh tropical cyclone and third named storm of the annual hurricane season, Chris developed from a tropical wave while roughly midway between Africa and the Lesser Antilles on August 21. Forming as a tropical depression, it remained weak for several days, crossing the Lesser Antilles, Hispaniola, and The Bahamas during this time. While offshore the coast of Florida on August 28, the depression intensified into Tropical Storm Chris. Thereafter, the system tracked rapidly north-northwestward and came ashore near Savannah, Georgia later that day. Once inland, Chris quickly weakened, and by early on the following day, it weakened to a tropical depression over South Carolina. Six hours later, Chris was absorbed by a cold front while over North Carolina, though the remnants of the system tracked across the Eastern United States and Atlantic Canada before dissipating on August 30.

In the Leeward Islands and U.S. Virgin Islands, Chris produced only light rainfall, that caused no damage or fatalities. Heavy rainfall occurred in Puerto Rico, which damaged 100 homes and caused three fatalities. Large amounts of precipitation also fell in Hispaniola, though no damage was reported. In the United States, much of the damage occurred due to tornadoes, especially in The Carolinas. A tornado in South Carolina destroyed at least 15 mobile homes, caused one fatality, and resulted in a brief shutdown of U.S. Route 301. Another destructive tornado occurred in Virginia. Two additional deaths were reported in New York, two from drowning and one from a tree falling onto a car. Although winds were light, at least 118,000 people from South Carolina to Maine were left without electricity. The dissipating storm produced light winds and precipitation in Nova Scotia. Overall, Tropical Storm Chris was attributed to four fatalities and $2.25 million (1988 USD) in losses.

Meteorological history

A tropical wave emerged into the Atlantic from the west coast of Africa on August 15. Six days later, the system developed into Tropical Depression Seven while centered halfway between the Lesser Antilles and Africa. The depression tracked west-northwestward around the periphery of a subtropical surface high pressure ridge. After strengthening minimally, the depression struck Guadeloupe late on August 23 and entered the Caribbean Sea shortly thereafter. By August 25, the depression made landfall near Santo Domingo, Dominican Republic. Despite the mountainous terrain of Hispaniola, the depression did not weaken and re-emerged into the Atlantic from the northern coast of Haiti early on August 26. The depression curved northwestward and did not strengthen. On August 27, the depression made another landfall near Andros Town on Andros, Bahamas. Thereafter, the depression curved north-northwestward and remained offshore of Florida.

As a result, the depression was finally upgraded to Tropical Storm Chris. After moving inland, Chris quickly weakened and was downgraded to a tropical depression near Columbia, South Carolina on August 29. Shortly thereafter, Chris merged with a cold front over North Carolina. The remnants of Chris tracked east-northeastward across the Eastern United States. Eventually, the remnants briefly re-emerged into the Atlantic from New England, then moved across Nova Scotia before dissipating near Cape Breton Island on August 30.

Preparations
In preparation of the tropical depression, officials in Puerto Rico closed public schools and sent federal workers home early. At 1000 UTC on August 28, a tropical storm watch was issued for Edisto Beach, South Carolina, to Cape Hatteras, North Carolina. Two hours later, areas from Savannah, Georgia, to Cape Hatteras North Carolina, were placed under a tropical storm warning. They were later discontinued at an unknown time. Residents of Charleston, South Carolina, complained of little warning in advance of the storm. However, as Chris moved ashore only nine hours after becoming a tropical storm, there was minimal time for preparations.

Impact

Lesser and Greater Antilles
In the United States Virgin Islands, the depression dropped  of rain. Heavy rainfall resulting in flooding, which damaged at least 100 homes and left 485 people homeless. By August 24, at least 15 people evacuated their homes because of flooding.
Due to high winds, two cars were crushed by falling trees, causing the deaths of two men and one 12-year-old boy. Hispaniola received heavy rain and  winds but no deaths or damage was reported. In the Bahamas, the storm brought winds of  but left no damage.

United States

The outer bands of Chris produced  of rain in Florida, though no damage was reported.
Elsewhere in Georgia, winds were light and were below tropical storm force.

Several tornadoes were spawned in the state, one of which caused one fatality, one injury, and destroyed at least 15 mobile homes in Clarendon County. Overall, tornadoes in the state collectively resulted in more than $550,000 in damage (1988 USD). Debris littered U.S. Route 301, which briefly shutdown that highway. However, 18,000 people in Charleston and other nearby communities lost electricity. In addition, one mobile home was destroyed and another was overturned in Olanta. Near Columbia,  of rain fell in only an hour, leaving standing water on several roads, including Interstate 26.

In North Carolina, a tornado spawned in Iredell County threw a tractor-trailer into a building at an industrial park. The tornado also struck the Iredell Container Corp. building and damaged several nearby mobile homes. As a result, numerous residents of Iredell County were left without gas or electricity. Four houses and a produce stand were destroyed by another tornado along U.S. Route 401 in Cumberland County. A third tornado in Granville County caused one injury and light damage. Collectively, the three tornadoes in the state caused at least $1 million (1988 USD) in damage.

In Mecklenburg County, Virginia, an F2 tornado spawned near Chase City damaged or destroyed ten buildings, including a mobile home, which was wrapped completely around a tree. Additionally, several vehicles were damaged and one injury occurred. Damage from that tornado reached about $700,000 (1988 USD). A wind gust reaching  was reported in Baltimore, though sustained winds were below tropical storm force. Similar amounts of rainfall occurred in other nearby states such as Delaware, New Jersey, and Pennsylvania; minor creek flooding occurred in those three states. Power lines were snapped in Essex County, New Jersey.

The storm downed power lines on Staten Island and Long Island in New York, leaving 31,000 people without power. However, many had their electricity restored within 24 hours. A woman was killed in Mamaroneck when an oak tree fell on her car. According to New York City Transit officials, trees also fell on tracks, which slowed transportation services during rush hour. Two other fatalities when two people canoed in the Highland Falls Reservoir; high winds tipped their canoe and both people subsequently drowned. In Connecticut, gusty winds felled trees, which struck power lines, leaving at least 59,000 people without electricity. High winds in Maine from the storm damaged power lines, leaving 10,000 people without electricity. The storm also damaged four houses and several automobiles near Crystal Lake. Throughout the United States, damaged totaled to at least $2.25 million (1988 USD).

Canada
There were no reports of damage.

See also

Other storms of the same name
Hurricane Isaias - Took a very similar track in 2020.
 List of North Carolina hurricanes (1980–1999)

References

Chris
Chris (1988)
Chris